Beaumettes is a commune in the Vaucluse department in the Provence-Alpes-Côte d'Azur region in southeastern France.

Geography
The village lies on the right bank of the Calavon, which forms all of the commune's southern border.

See also
Communes of the Vaucluse department
Luberon

References

Communes of Vaucluse